Tremadog Bay is a large inlet of Cardigan Bay, defined by the north Cambrian Coast and the Llŷn Peninsula of north Wales.

The Afon Glaslyn flows into the north of the bay and Saint Tudwal's Islands lie at the western end of the bay. Pwllheli, the main market town of the Llŷn Peninsula, together with the historic towns of Harlech and Criccieth, and Abersoch, a popular location for water sports, all lie on its shores.

External links 
Overview of its marine biology

Cardigan Bay